Marie-Louise Tenèze (1922–2016) was a French ethnologist and folklorist who is remembered for her research into popular French fairy tales, including those transmitted by word of mouth. Inspired by Paul Delarue in the 1950s, in 2000 she completed his Le Conte populaire français : catalogue raisonné des versions de France et des pays de langue française d'outre-mer. She also collaborated with researchers from Göttingen on the Enzyklopädie des Märchens, published by De Gruyter. In collaboration with the enthnologist Jean-Michel Guilcher she investigated traditional dances. Working in particular with Josiane Bru, she devoted the remainder of her life to investigating the history of oral tales and traditions.

References

1922 births
2016 deaths
People from Saint-Avold
French folklorists
French ethnologists
20th-century French writers
20th-century French women writers
21st-century French writers
21st-century French women writers